The Peugeot 403 is a mid-size car manufactured and marketed by Peugeot between May 1955 and October 1966. A total of 1,214,121 of all types, including commercial models, were produced, making it the first Peugeot to exceed one million in sales.

History
The 403 debuted as a sedan/saloon on 20 April 1955 at the Trocadéro Palace in Paris. For several months before it was launched, numerous 403s, their badges removed, were driving on the roads near the manufacturer's Sochaux factory. They became so familiar that the locals no longer noticed them, but attracted the Paris motoring press to a town usually of little interest to the national media.

The TN3 engine size gave the car a "tax horsepower" of 8 CV, which placed it a class below the soon-to-be-replaced 11 CV Citroën Traction, but at least one class above the small cars produced by the principal competitor manufacturers.

When it was first shown, and until after 1958, the leading edge of car's nose carried an angular, forward-leaning chrome lion bonnet ornament – as Peugeot's trade mark. That was removed for 1959, due to safety concerns, and the logo was incorporated into a shield-shaped grill emblem.

Subsequently the semaphore-style trafficators on the C-pillars were replaced with flashing indicators within the light cluster. The front lights were modified to conform to new standards and in 1957 parallel windscreen wipers were substituted for the original "cross hands" design featured at launch.

Although, the car was subject to numerous improvements during production, mostly minor. Improvements for 1959, included moving the nozzles for the windscreen washer from the strip of metal between the base of the windscreen and the bonnet/hood a short distance to the rear edge of the bonnet/hood itself. This was also the year the semi-circular ring inside the lower half of the steering wheel operating the horn was replaced by a full circular horn-ring.

Design
Styled by Pinin Farina, the 403 featured ponton, three-box styling incorporating, except on the most basic models, a metal sunroof. The collaboration with PininFarina marked the start of a partnership which would see the Italian designer producing designs for Peugeot, including those many mainstream volume models, for more than fifty years. Regarding the 403 itself there were persistent rumours that the design was one originally intended for a replacement Fiat 1900 which had been rejected when Turin had decided to defer replacement of the Fiat for another four years.

Unusual in Europe at the time were the wide, 90° opening rear doors. Also unusual were the windows in the rear doors that lowered fully, despite the intrusion of the wheel arch into the door frame.

Engine
The 403 used an enlarged version of the Peugeot 203's 1290 cc petrol engine. An unusual feature at the time was the thermostatically controlled engine fan which cut out when the engine temperature fell to 75°C and reengaged when the engine temperature increased to 84°C. Claimed advantages included an improvement in fuel consumption of between 5% and 10% according to average speed and the avoidance, under many conditions, of fan noise. A small hot water-activated heating device for the carburetor linked to the heater for the passenger cabin — operating only when the driver activated the cabin heat, but not when the ambient temperature was high enough for the heater to be left off.

A diesel powered Peugeot 403 estate was introduced in the Autumn of 1958, the first of a long line, followed by a diesel saloon a year later.

After the 203's discontinuation in 1960, a  version of its 1290 cc powerplant became available as an option on a reduced specification version of the 403, branded initially as the "403 Sept" ("7") and soon afterwards as the "403 Berline Luxe". Car tax in France was mostly based on engine size, and the smaller engined 403 fell within the 7CV taxation class rather than the 8CV of the bigger version.

Transmission
The 403 used a manual 4-speed all-synchromesh transmission driving the rear wheels. The gear change lever stuck out from the right side of the steering column.

For the Paris Motor Show in October 1957 the manufacturer offered, at extra cost, an electro-magnetic Jaeger automatic clutch, activated when changing gear.

Interior
The front seats reclined, allowing their seat backs to be flush with the cushions of the rear seat, creating a "couchette".

Body variants
The Familiale provided a third row of seats and was described as a 7/8 seater while the Commerciale offered a more conventional seat configuration for an estate car.

The lengthened 403 estate had a solid rear axle fitted to an aluminum differential case. It used a manual column shift and in "Familiale" trim included fully reclinable front seats. Sunroof and steel belted radial tires were standard. 

A two-door cabriolet version of the car was also offered, with a luxurious interior featuring high quality leather upholstery. In 1958 the 403 cabriolet cost 80% more than the entry level "berline grand luxe" 403 sedan, and presumably for this reason the convertible 403 was produced and sold only in very modest numbers. In the spring of 1961 production of the 403 cabriolet ended, in anticipation of the launch later that year of the manufacturer's 404 Cabriolet.

2-door pickup and 3-door van commercial variants of the 403 were also produced.

Production
Peugeot 403 production (units):

 1955    .....  21,326 
 1956    ..... 71,551
 1957    ...
 1958    ...  121,757
 1959    ...
 1960    ...
 1961    .....  78,296
 1962    ....
 1963    ....
 1964    .....  53,371
 1965    .....  27,296
 1966    .....  40,805 (incl. camionnettes)

This data does not include 403 based light trucks

Largely superseded by the Peugeot 404 in 1960, the 403 did remain available as a budget alternative. While the 403 saloon was taken out of production at the end of October 1966, leaving only the pickup truck (camionnette). This was supplanted by the 404 pickup in March 1967.

In addition to Argentinian and Australian production, the local Volkswagen assembler in New Zealand assembled 1,033 Peugeot 403s in just under four years, beginning in March 1960.

The Argentinian version reached 90% integration of local parts.

Culture

On the American television show Columbo, starring Peter Falk, the shambling hero, detective Lt. Columbo, drove a shabby 403 cabriolet dating from 1959 or 1960. According to the 1991 episode "Columbo and the Murder of a Rock Star", the car's cabriolet roof had never been lowered during his years of ownership. However, in the 1972 episode "Lady in Waiting" and in the 1973 episode "The Most Dangerous Match", Columbo can be seen driving the car with a lowered roof. 

The 403 features in Knife in the Water, Roman Polanski's 1962 Polish drama, being driven through the Masurian Lake District in northeastern Poland.

References

External links

403
Mid-size cars
1960s cars
Cars introduced in 1955
Cars discontinued in 1966
Columbo
Sedans
Rear-wheel-drive vehicles
Convertibles
Station wagons